The following is a list of the 326 communes of the Ariège department of France.

The communes cooperate in the following intercommunalities (as of 2020):
Communauté d'agglomération Pays Foix-Varilhes
Communauté de communes Arize Lèze
Communauté de communes Couserans-Pyrénées
Communauté de communes de la Haute-Ariège
Communauté de communes du Pays de Mirepoix
Communauté de communes du Pays d'Olmes
Communauté de communes du Pays de Tarascon
Communauté de communes des Portes d'Ariège Pyrénées

References

Ariege